Wisconsin's 9th congressional district was a congressional district of the United States House of Representatives in Wisconsin.  It was created following the 1870 Census along with the 8th district, and was disbanded after the 2000 Census. 

From 1965 to 2003, the district included most of the western and north-western suburbs of Milwaukee. In its final configuration, it contained all of Washington and Ozaukee counties, most of Dodge and Jefferson counties, the northern and western halves of Waukesha county and the eastern parts of Sheboygan county, including the town itself. It was usually the most Republican district in the state, voting 63% to 34% for George Bush over Al Gore at the 2000 election. The district was also the longest in the state (as well as the last) to be represented by a member of the Wisconsin Progressive Party however, when the party briefly surged to dominate Wisconsin’s politics during the 1930s, being represented by Merlin Hull for twelve years until 1947, when he switched to the Republican Party. At the time, the district covered much of the far western part of the state.

List of members representing the district

Electoral history

Write-in and minor candidate notes: In 1886, write-ins received 50 votes. In 1888, write-ins received 122 votes. In 1890, George Wilbur Peck received 25 votes as a write-in.  In 1992, write-ins received 27 votes.  In 1994, write-ins received 336 votes.  In 1996, write-ins received 225 votes.  In 1998, write-ins received 368 votes.  In 2000, write-ins received 237 votes.

References

 Congressional Biographical Directory of the United States 1774–present

Former congressional districts of the United States
09
Constituencies established in 1883
1883 establishments in Wisconsin
Constituencies disestablished in 2003
2003 disestablishments in Wisconsin